The South Island Party is the name of two unrelated political parties from New Zealand:
The NZ South Island Party stood in the 1999 General Election
The South Island Party (2008) stood in the 2008 General Election